Donald J. Patterson (born April 11, 1972) is a professor of computer science at Westmont College in Santa Barbara, California.  He is an expert on topics including cryptocurrency, health technology, and technology in the context of civilizational collapse.

Education
Dr. Patterson earned bachelor's and master's degrees from Cornell University before spending four years in Japan and Sardinia as a naval operations officer. He earned a doctorate in computer science from the University of Washington and has been recognised for his work on collapse informatics and abstract object usage.

Research & Career 
Based on his research, he co-founded more than four startup companies. He previously worked at the University of California, Irvine Donald Bren School of Information and Computer Sciences, where he earned tenure and served as director of the Laboratory for Ubiquitous Computing and Interaction.

Most cited articles

Kestenbaum B, Sampson JN, Rudser KD, Patterson DJ, Seliger SL, Young B, Sherrard DJ, and Andress DL. Serum phosphate levels and mortality risk among people with chronic kidney disease. Journal of the American Society of Nephrology, 16:520–528, 2005.
Philipose M, Fishkin KP, Perkowitz M, Patterson DJ, Fox D, Kautz H, Hahnel D. Inferring activities from interactions with objects. IEEE pervasive computing. 2004 Oct;3(4):50-7. 
Liao L, Patterson DJ, Fox D, Kautz H. Learning and inferring transportation routines. Artificial intelligence. 2007 Apr 1;171(5-6):311-31.
Patterson DJ, Liao L, Fox D, Kautz H. Inferring high-level behavior from low-level sensors. InInternational Conference on Ubiquitous Computing 2003 Oct 12 (pp. 73–89). Springer, Berlin, Heidelberg. 
Patterson DJ, Fox D, Kautz H, Philipose M. Fine-grained activity recognition by aggregating abstract object usage. In Ninth IEEE International Symposium on Wearable Computers (ISWC'05) 2005 Oct 18 (pp. 44–51).

External links
Google Scholar - Donald J. Patterson

References 

Cornell University alumni
University of Washington alumni
Living people
1972 births